Liao Jintao (born 24 February 2000) is a Chinese footballer currently playing as a midfielder for Kunshan.

Club career
Liao Jintao would play for the Guangzhou youth team before he joined third tier club Wuhan Three Towns for the 2019 China League Two campaign. After only one season he returned to Guangzhou where he was utilized sparingly in cup matches before joining second tier club Kunshan on 26 April 2022. He would go on to establish himself as regular within the team and was part of the squad that won the division and promotion to the top tier at the end of the 2022 China League One campaign.

Career statistics
.

Honours

Club 
Kunshan
 China League One: 2022

References

External links
Liao Jintao at Worldfootball.net

2000 births
Living people
Chinese footballers
China youth international footballers
Association football midfielders
China League One players
Guangzhou F.C. players